The following is an outline of 1979 in spaceflight.

Launches

|colspan=8 style="background:white;"|

January
|-

|colspan=8 style="background:white;"|

February
|-

|colspan=8 style="background:white;"|

March
|-

|colspan=8 style="background:white;"|

April
|-

|colspan=8 style="background:white;"|

May
|-

|colspan=8 style="background:white;"|

June
|-

|colspan=8 style="background:white;"|

July
|-

|colspan=8 style="background:white;"|

August
|-

|colspan=8 style="background:white;"|

September
|-

|colspan=8 style="background:white;"|

October
|-

|colspan=8 style="background:white;"|

November
|-

|colspan=8 style="background:white;"|

December
|-

|}

Deep Space Rendezvous

EVAs

References

Footnotes

 
Spaceflight by year